Travis Simms (born 1 May 1971) is a Democratic member of the Connecticut House of Representatives, where he represents the 140th Assembly District. The district consists of the central part of the city of Norwalk. He previously served on Norwalk's Common Council. Prior to his political career he was a professional boxer in the super welterweight (154 lb) division.

Background
Simms is a native of the South Norwalk section of Norwalk, Connecticut. His childhood street bears his name "Travis Simms Way". He is currently a member of the Norwalk Common Council.  His identical twin brother, Tarvis Simms, is also a fighter.

Boxing career
Simms, nicknamed "Tremendous", turned pro late at the age of 26, after a stellar amateur career.  Although he held the title twice, he was still undefeated until his 26th bout. He first won it in 2003, but was stripped of the belt in May 2005 because he filed a lawsuit against the WBA Organization (in November 2004) for not enforcing his mandatory contract that he received from the organization when he won the regular world title from Alejandro Garcia 2 December 2003.

Simms made a request to enforce his mandate or strip the Super champion Ronald "Winky" Wright.

As the result of an out-of-court settlement in the summer of 2006, the WBA reinstated Simms as "Champion in Recess" in August 2006 while maintaining the full champion status of reigning champion Jose Antonio Rivera. On 6 January 2007, Simms won a nine-round knockout victory against Jose Antonio "El Gallo" Rivera in a championship bout in Hollywood, Florida.

On 7 July 2007, Simms lost his title in a controversial Decision to Joachim Alcine, of Montreal, Quebec (Canada) in the Arena at Harbor Yard in Bridgeport, Connecticut

Later in life
Police arrested Simms on 19 August 2012 after he refused to leave a large disturbance involving the widow of his adopted brother. He was found not guilty on all charges on 4 December 2014. 
Also, on Monday 20 October 2014 Simms was arrested after reporting a gun stolen out of his Range Rover. He informed police that the handgun was loaded with 12 rounds of ammunition which is a violation of Connecticut law which limits magazine capacity to 10 rounds.

Political career
For a decade, Simms served on the Norwalk City Council representing District B consisting of South Norwalk. In November 2018, Simms won the state legislature's 140th seat representing Norwalk.

References

External links
 

1971 births
Democratic Party members of the Connecticut House of Representatives
Connecticut city council members
Light-middleweight boxers
Living people
Politicians from Norwalk, Connecticut
Sportspeople from Norwalk, Connecticut
Welterweight boxers
World boxing champions
Boxers from Connecticut
American twins
American male boxers
21st-century American politicians